Félix Iván Mangual Guilbe (born 22 July 1951) is a Puerto Rican sprinter. He competed in the men's 400 metres at the 1976 Summer Olympics.

References

External links
 

1951 births
Living people
Athletes (track and field) at the 1975 Pan American Games
Athletes (track and field) at the 1976 Summer Olympics
Puerto Rican male sprinters
Olympic track and field athletes of Puerto Rico
Place of birth missing (living people)
Central American and Caribbean Games medalists in athletics
Pan American Games competitors for Puerto Rico